Rubus tuberculatus  is a bramble found in parts of north west Europe, including Britain and Ireland.

Description
 Rubus tuberculatus  is a low arching shrub, with distinctive two toned stems; the sheltered side is green, while the exposed side is matt red. The stem bears abundant prickles, noticeably more than most other  Rubi

References

tuberculatus
Flora of England
Flora of Ireland